Eltxo is a genus of wood midges in the family Cecidomyiidae. The single described species, Eltxo cretaceus, is only known from amber inclusions from the Lower Cretaceous of Spain.

References

Cecidomyiidae genera

Insects described in 2000
Fossil taxa described in 2000
Monotypic Diptera genera
Diptera of Europe
Taxa named by Antonio Arillo
Taxa named by Andre Nel
Prehistoric Diptera genera